Middlecreek Township is the name of some places in the U.S. state of Pennsylvania:

Middlecreek Township, Snyder County, Pennsylvania
Middlecreek Township, Somerset County, Pennsylvania

Pennsylvania township disambiguation pages